Parliamentary elections were held in Venda on 5 and 6 July 1978. The Venda Independence People's Party won 31 of the 42 elected seats in the Legislative Assembly.

Electoral system
The Legislative Assembly consisted of 84 seats, half of which were elected and half of which were appointed.

Results

References

Venda
Elections in Venda
July 1978 events in Africa